Michael or Mike Watt may refer to:
Michael Watt (doctor) (1887–1967), New Zealand doctor and public health administrator
Michael Watt (footballer) (born 1970), Scottish former footballer
Michael Watt (field hockey) (born 1987), Irish field hockey player
Michael Watt (philanthropist) (born 1940), New Zealand entrepreneur, philanthropist, and investor
Mike Watt (born 1957), American bass guitarist, singer and songwriter
Mike Watt (ice hockey) (born 1976), Canadian ice hockey player
Mike Watt (sport shooter) (1936–2015), New Zealand sport shooter
 Mike Watt, a fictional character in the British sitcom Spaced (see List of characters in Spaced)
 Mike Watt (Neighbours), a fictional character on the Australian soap opera Neighbours

See also
Michael Watts (born 1951), Berkeley professor
Michael Watts (journalist) (1938–2018), British journalist and broadcaster